Al-Shamiyah is a town in northwestern Syria, administratively part of the Latakia Governorate, located north of Latakia. Nearby localities include Burj Islam to the north, Burj al-Qasab and Kirsana to the south. According to the Syria Central Bureau of Statistics, Al-Shamiyah had a population of 2,982 in the 2004 census. Its inhabitants are predominantly Alawites.

References

Populated places in Latakia District
Alawite communities in Syria